The following lists events that happened during 2003 in Sudan.

Incumbents
President: Omar al-Bashir
Vice President:
 Ali Osman Taha (First)
 Moses Kacoul Machar (Second)

Events

February
 February 9 - The War in Darfur starts.

July
 July 8 - Sudan Airways Flight 139, with 117 people on board, crashes in Sudan.

References

 
2000s in Sudan
Years of the 21st century in Sudan
Sudan
Sudan